The Iron Age is an archaeological age, the last of the three-age system of Old World prehistory.
It follows the Bronze Age, in the Ancient Near East beginning c. 1200 BC, and in Europe beginning
after c. 800 BC.
It is taken to end with the beginning of Classical Antiquity, in about the 6th century BC, 
although in Northern Europe, the Germanic Iron Age is taken to last until the beginning of the Viking Age, c. AD 800.

The term "Iron Age" is mostly limited to Europe, the Near East, and the Indian subcontinent, although
West Africa also had iron metallurgy, beginning with the Nok culture c. 550 BC and spread by the Bantu expansion.
There are also cast iron artefacts in China from about 500 BC, 
but use of iron was minimal, and the Bronze Age in China is usually extended to the beginning of the classical period (Qin dynasty).

Africa

Europe

Eurasian Steppe and Central Asia

East Asia

South Asia

West Asia

See also
List of pre-modern states
 List of Bronze Age states 
 List of Classical Age states 
 List of states during Late Antiquity
 List of states during the Middle Ages 
 List of former sovereign states
 List of ancient great powers

References

External links
History Files
Livius Ancient History Articles
World History Maps (Individual) from 1300 BC to 1500 AD

Iron
Iron Age